Wheel of Fortune is a British television game show based on the American show of the same name created by Merv Griffin. Contestants compete to solve word puzzles, similar to those used in Hangman, to win cash and prizes. The title refers to the show's giant carnival wheel that contestants spin throughout the course of the game to determine their cash and/or prizes.

The programme was produced by Scottish Television Enterprises, and aired between 19 July 1988 and 21 December 2001 for ITV. It mostly follows the same general format from the original version of the programme from the United States, with a few minor differences.

Gameplay
Unlike the American version, where the numbers on the wheel correspond to the amount of money won by each contestant, the British version instead referred to these amounts as 'points' – they had no cash value, their only purpose was to determine the grand finalist, or to choose a winner for a particular round. There was a reason for this: between 1960 and 1992, the Independent Broadcasting Authority and, for the last two years, its successor the Independent Television Commission imposed caps on the top prize game shows could give away per week, and standardising the prize on offer per episode ensured the programme did not breach the set limits.

Points earned from all players carried on to proceeding rounds, and only scores for the current round were susceptible to Bankrupts, meaning a winner could be crowned that never solved a puzzle, but acquired a large number of points. This rule would actually encourage sacrificing a player's turn if he or she did not know the puzzle rather than risking his or her points by spinning again.

For the first three series, before the recording of each episode, each contestant spun the wheel; the contestant with the highest score would start the first round. In the programme proper, the contestant was asked a 50/50 trivia question, and if the contestant answered correctly, they spun the wheel. If the contestant landed on a number, they had to pick a letter. If the letter appeared on the puzzle board, the contestant earned the value multiplied by the number of times the letter appeared.  A player was allowed to purchase a vowel for a flat rate of 250 points for any number of repetitions as long as that vowel appeared in the puzzle.  The contestant would then spin the wheel again, but the contestant's turn would end if the contestant either (a) landed on a number but picked a letter that did not appear on the puzzle board, earning the contestant no points (but not deducting the number the contestant landed on); (b) bought a vowel that did not appear in the puzzle (still costing the 250 points); (c) landed on the "LOSE A TURN" space; (d) landed on the "BANKRUPT" space, losing the contestant's total score for that round (but not from previous rounds); or (e) attempting to solve the puzzle but giving an incorrect answer.

If the contestant landed on the "FREE SPIN", the contestant would be given a "FREE SPIN" token and would spin the wheel again.  If the contestant landed on a number but picked a letter that did not appear on the puzzle board, or landed on the "LOSE A TURN" space or the "BANKRUPT" space, the contestant could give their "FREE SPIN" loop to the host and spin again.  They could alternatively hand over play to the next contestant.

If the contestant answered the 50/50 trivia question incorrectly, they would not spin the wheel; play would move on to the next contestant.

In the speed round, the host would spin the wheel with the centre player's arrow determining the point value for each contestant. Vowels were worth nothing, and consonants were worth whatever the value spun. The left player would go first. No more 50/50 questions were asked.

From the fourth series onward, the 50/50 trivia individual questions were dropped. Instead, at the start of each round, the contestants would be asked a general knowledge question and the first contestant to buzz in and answer correctly would gain control of the wheel (this included the speed-up round).

Also from the fourth series onward, from Round 3 to the end, the points on the wheel were worth double (although the wheel did not show the values at double points).

The yellow (centre) player's arrow determined the point value for each consonant in the speed-up round (and during the final spin both Walsh and Leslie employed the catchphrase "No more spinning, just winning!" while explaining how the speed-up round worked).  Vowels were worth nothing, and consonants were worth the value spun.  In case of a tie, each player tied for the lead spun the wheel and the player who spun the higher number went through. In the final series, this was replaced by a tie break question on the buzzer, and whoever answered correctly first went into the final.

In the Grand Finale, the winning contestant chose from one of three bonus prizes to play for: a car, a luxury holiday, or a cash prize.  The series in 1994 differed, in that the prize the contestant won for solving the puzzle was a car plus the cash prize of £10,000.  In one episode in 1994, the prize was two cars and £10,000. From 1995 to 1998, the player chose one of two envelopes, one with the car and the other with £20,000. The prize chosen, the Grand Finale continued with the contestant choosing five consonants and a vowel.  The contestant had 15 seconds to solve the puzzle to win the prize.  Unlike other versions, the player could solve any one word individually, and then work on any other word in the puzzle.  For example, if the puzzle was "A CUP OF TEA", the player could solve "OF", then "A", then "TEA", and finally "CUP" to complete the puzzle.

In the final series, "LOSE A TURN" was changed to "MISS A TURN", for reasons unknown, and a "500 Gamble" wedge was added.  If a player landed on the latter wedge, they had the option of going for 500 points per letter or gambling their round score.  If they chose to gamble their points and called a correct letter, their score would be doubled with 1,000 (2,000 starting in the third round) for each appearance of said consonant added to the sum; an incorrect letter was the same as Bankrupt.

In the rare event two or all three players were tied for first place, the host had each player spin the wheel once, and the highest number spun won the game.  Spinning a "BANKRUPT," "LOSE A TURN/MISS A TURN," or "FREE SPIN" did not allow another spin and thus counted as a zero score.

Prizes
Unlike the original American version, instead of cash prizes, successful spinners from each round were rewarded with a choice of three prizes which might contain household appliances, a holiday, etc. In 1988 the prizes for the final were a trip (an oriental furnished living room on 6 September and a luxury bathroom on 13 September), a new car (or sometimes a new boat), or a cash jackpot at £3,000 (£2,000 on the last two episodes of the first series). In 1989, the cash value increased to £4,000, from 1993 the cash value increased again to £5,000. On the celebrity specials, solving the final puzzle donated £5,000 to the celebrity's favourite charity. During the 1994 series, solving the final puzzle won both £10,000 and a new car. In some episodes in 1994 this was increased to two cars and £10,000. The prize was later increased to £20,000 or a car from 1995–1998, with the winning contestant randomly selecting his/her prize by choosing one of two sealed envelopes.

During the daytime series, winners of each round could choose from an array of prizes laid out on stage, (CD player, dishwasher, etc.) The cash prize for the final puzzle was dropped to £2,000.  Players could also pick the same prize more than once and on some occasions, contestants made requests for an opponent who had won nothing to pick a prize, and Leslie always upheld the request.

All contestants in all series, win or lose, went home with a Wheel of Fortune watch (and sometimes other WoF-related merchandise).

In the final, the winning contestant had a free choice of five consonants and one vowel in order to help identify the answer within 15 seconds and win the prize.

Special prizes
 During the primetime series, the second and third round began with the hostess presenting a special prize (usually jewellery) which could be won by landing on a prize star and going on to solve the puzzle.
 During Bradley Walsh's run, the first player in the third round to land on a special disc and also put a letter on the board won the contents of "Brad's Box". This bonus carried over into the prime time John Leslie series and was renamed "Leslie's Luxury" but during Leslie's series, there were two boxes; one would be for the men, and the other one would be for the women (prime time series).
Starting in 1996, one puzzle would contain a "cash pot" letter (gold in 1996 and 1997, red thereafter) which would net that player £100 for solving the puzzle immediately after finding the letter (both formats).
 The winning contestant had a chance to win another £100 by guessing a special, partially-revealed "puzzler" related to the puzzle just solved. (daytime series).
 During the second round on the daily series, a mystery prize would be awarded to the contestant if he/she picked up the token and solved the round two puzzle.

Special episodes
On occasion, the series has had several episodes featuring specific kinds of contestants:
 On the ninth episode of the second series and the eleventh episode of the fourth series, the contestants were all women engaged to be married. The puzzles on both shows were all wedding related.
 On the twelfth episode of the third series and the eleventh episode of the fourth series, the contestants (two women and one man) were retired.

Studio designs
From 1988 to 1993, the host would emerge from the right stairs. Then as the presenter introduces the letter spinner, the letter spinner would walk down the left stairs. Between 1994 and 2000, the host and the letter spinner would emerge from the puzzle board that rotated clockwise. And with the show's switched to widescreen in 2001, the host and the letter spinner would emerge from the prize pod.

The original design of the wheel was based on the American design, placed above ground on top of layers with lights. From 1994 to the end, the wheel was placed on the ground.

Wrong way spin outtake
One notable outtake from the show involved a man who spun the wheel in the wrong direction, forcing the show to be postponed until the next day.  As the British wheel has a gearing mechanism to regulate its speed, this action promptly broke said gears, and the studio technicians spent hours trying to fix it.

Wheel configurations
The top point space was 1000 points, with one such space in round 1. One more space was added in round 2, along with a second Bankrupt, and a third 1,000-point space was added in round 3. Also, starting from series 4 in 1992, values were doubled beginning from round 3 onward, making the top point spaces worth 2,000 points. For the third series in 1991 only, a third Bankrupt was added in round 3.

Unlike the board used on the American version since 1997, the United Kingdom version's puzzle board was never electronic, so the regular puzzle would be placed at the top portion of the board while the puzzler would fill any unused lines below. The puzzle board's shape from 1994 to early 2000 was the same as the current American puzzle board. From 1988 to 1993, its border was styled like the one on the American puzzle board used from 1981 to 1993. The background colour for unused trilons on the UK's puzzle board was green from 1988 to 1993, after which it was changed to blue.

In 2001, Lose A Turn was renamed Miss A Turn and a 500 Gamble space was added. When 500 Gamble was landed on, the player had a choice of going for the regular 500 points or gambling their round score on a correct letter.  If the contestant chose to gamble, each appearance of a correct letter increased their score by 1,000 points plus their current score while an incorrect letter took away all the points they accumulated in the round.

Transmissions

Series

Specials

The two Hogmanay Specials were only broadcast to the Scottish and Grampian Television regions.
 1988: With Amanda Laird, Teri Lally and Andy Cameron.
 1989: With Andy Cameron, Paul Coia and Viv Lumsden.

Regional transmissions information

1988–1998
For the first ten series, the show was broadcast once a week in a primetime slot. With series 8, a number of regional ITV stations did broadcast episodes a few days later including the last episode on 31 December 1996.

1999
During the eleventh series, the programme was moved to a five-shows-a-week daytime slot and it aired at 2.40pm each afternoon from 2 March, after the sixth series of Dale's Supermarket Sweep concluded its run. It took a break from 28 May to 10 September 1999.

2000
The twelfth series began at the start of the year, and lasted until the start of December. During this series, the show's slot varied in different ITV regions.

 Carlton (London and Westcountry), Grampian and Scottish aired the episodes at 5:30pm.
 Anglia, Border, Granada, Meridian, Tyne Tees, Ulster and Yorkshire aired the episodes at 2:40pm until 31 March 2000, then Friday afternoons only from 18 May to 9 June. From 12 June, it was moved back to five-times-a-week at 1.30pm and then from 17 July, it was moved to 2:40pm, so not all the episodes aired.
 HTV followed Anglia's pattern until 8 May before switching to the 5:30pm slot.
 Carlton (Central) also followed Anglia's pattern until 12 June before moving the show to 5.30pm.

Additional episodes were broadcast by all ITV regions on Sundays during May.

2001
During the thirteenth series, most ITV regions broadcast episodes at 5.30pm from 2 January to 22 June 2001, except for Meridian, Yorkshire, Tyne Tees, before being switched to a Saturday afternoon slot until 4 August 2001. The final thirty episodes (series fourteen) were networked at 2.40pm, from 12 November to 21 December.

Notes

References

External links

Wheel of Fortune (UK) at BFI

1990s British television series
1988 British television series debuts
2001 British television series endings
1980s British game shows
1990s British game shows
2000s British game shows
British television series based on American television series
English-language television shows
ITV game shows
Roulette and wheel games
Scottish television shows
Television shows produced by Scottish Television
Television series by CBS Studios
Wheel of Fortune (franchise)